Giuseppe Forni is a paralympic athlete from Switzerland competing mainly in category T51 racing events.

Giuseepe was a fixture at four Paralympics, competing in multiple events in each games and winning medals at all four of the games however he never won a gold medal.  His first games were in 1988 Summer Paralympics where he competed in every individual track event from 100m to 1500m and the 4 × 100 m winning a bronze medal in the 200m.  In 1992 he extended his range from 100m to marathon and the relay but did not compete in the 200m here he gained bronze medals in the relay, 100m, 1500m and Marathon and a silver in the 200m.  At his third games he competed in the Marathon, 1500m, 800m and 400m winning a bronze medal in the 400m, while at his last games in 2000 he competed in four events between 200m and 1500m winning a bronze medal in the 1500m.

References

External links
 

Paralympic athletes of Switzerland
Athletes (track and field) at the 1988 Summer Paralympics
Athletes (track and field) at the 1992 Summer Paralympics
Athletes (track and field) at the 1996 Summer Paralympics
Athletes (track and field) at the 2000 Summer Paralympics
Paralympic silver medalists for Switzerland
Paralympic bronze medalists for Switzerland
Swiss male sprinters
Swiss male middle-distance runners
Swiss male long-distance runners
Living people
Year of birth missing (living people)
Medalists at the 1988 Summer Paralympics
Medalists at the 1992 Summer Paralympics
Medalists at the 1996 Summer Paralympics
Medalists at the 2000 Summer Paralympics
Paralympic medalists in athletics (track and field)
Swiss male wheelchair racers